The 2016–17 Baylor Lady Bears basketball team will represent Baylor University in the 2016–17 NCAA Division I women's basketball season. Returning as head coach was Hall of Famer Kim Mulkey for her 17th season. The team plays its home games at the Ferrell Center in Waco, Texas and were members of the Big 12 Conference. They finish the season 33–4, 17–1 in Big 12 to win the Big 12 regular season title. They advanced to the championship game of the Big 12 women's tournament where they upset by West Virginia. They earn an at-large bid to the NCAA women's tournament as a No. 1 seed where they defeat Texas Southern and California in the first and second rounds, Louisville in the sweet sixteen before losing to Mississippi State in the elite eight.

Roster

Rankings
2016–17 NCAA Division I women's basketball rankings

Schedule

|-
! colspan=9 style=""| Exhibition

|-
!colspan=9 style=""| Non-conference regular season

|-
!colspan=9 style=""| Big 12 regular season

|-
!colspan=9 style="" | 

|-
!colspan=9 style="" | 

Source

See also
 2016–17 Baylor Bears basketball team

References

Baylor Bears women's basketball seasons
Baylor
Baylor